A by-election was held for the New South Wales Legislative Assembly electorate of Lower Hunter on 26 November 1877 because Archibald Jacob was appointed Secretary for Mines in the fourth Robertson ministry. Jacob had been unopposed at the election in October 1877, and ministerial by-elections were usually uncontested.

Dates

Result

Archibald Jacob was appointed Secretary for Mines in the fourth Robertson ministry.

See also
Electoral results for the district of Lower Hunter
List of New South Wales state by-elections

Notes

References

1877 elections in Australia
New South Wales state by-elections
1870s in New South Wales